The following is a list of pipeline accidents in the United States in 1976. It is one of several lists of U.S. pipeline accidents. See also: list of natural gas and oil production accidents in the United States.

Incidents 

This is not a complete list of all pipeline accidents. For natural gas alone, the Pipeline and Hazardous Materials Safety Administration (PHMSA), a United States Department of Transportation agency, has collected data on more than 3,200 accidents deemed serious or significant since 1987.

A "significant incident" results in any of the following consequences:
 Fatality or injury requiring in-patient hospitalization.
 $50,000 or more in total costs, measured in 1984 dollars.
 Liquid releases of five or more barrels (42 US gal/barrel).
 Releases resulting in an unintentional fire or explosion.

PHMSA and the National Transportation Safety Board (NTSB) post-incident data and results of investigations into accidents involving pipelines that carry a variety of products, including natural gas, oil, diesel fuel, gasoline, kerosene, jet fuel, carbon dioxide, and other substances. Occasionally pipelines are re-purposed to carry different products.

The following incidents occurred during 1976:
 1976 On January 7, a repair crew working on a natural gas gathering compressor station at Cedardale, Oklahoma, opened the wrong valve in an attempt to increase gas flow. Natural gas & Natural Gas Liquids flowed out of an open 12-inch pipeline, and were ignited by an open flame heater. 5 of the crew were killed, and 2 seriously burned.
 1976 On January 10, a gas leak, at the Pathfinder Hotel, in Fremont, Nebraska, exploded, killing 20 people, and, injuring 39 others. A 6 foot by 6 foot section of sidewalk was hurled through the roof of a nearby bakery. A compression coupling, on a Aldyl-A plastic gas line, had pulled apart, causing gas to leak into the Hotel's basement.
 1976 An LPG/NGL pipeline ruptured near Whitharral, Texas, leading to a vapor cloud fire that killed one, severely burning 4 others who later died, destroyed two homes, and burned an area about 400 yards wide. A Low Frequency Electric Resistance Weld (LF-ERW) seam failure is suspected for the failure.
 1976 An improperly assembled compression coupling failed on a gas distribution line in Phoenix, Arizona on February 8, causing a house explosion that killed 2 people.
 1976 On March 2, an 18-inch Gulf Oil pipeline failure spilled about 21,000 gallons of crude oil into the Wisner Wildlife Area in Louisiana. There were no initial reports of wildlife being affected.
 1976 On March 16, a 6-inch ARCO pipeline failed near Tilden Township, Pennsylvania, spilling gasoline into a stream.
 1976 On March 27, a two-story building in Phenix City, Alabama, exploded and burned from a gas leak. The explosion and fire killed the six persons in the building. The NTSB found that gas at 20-psig pressure had leaked from a cracked, 3-inch cast iron gas main.
 1976 On April 20, a gas pipeline exploded and burned near Arkadelphia, Arkansas. There were no injuries.
 1976 A front loader hit a Standard Oil of California (now Chevron Corporation) 8-inch petroleum products pipeline in Los Angeles, California, during a road widening project along Venice Boulevard. 9 people were killed, a plastic factory was destroyed, and other serious property damage occurred. (June 16, 1976)
1976 On August 8, a house exploded from gas migrating through the soil, from a broken 4 inch gas main, in Allentown, Pennsylvania. 26 minutes later, gas then exploded in another house, causing a brick wall & part of the street to collapse. 2 firefighters were killed, 14 people injured, and 4 buildings destroyed.
 1976 A road grader hit a 20-inch gas transmission pipeline, near Calhoun, Louisiana. Six people were killed in the ensuing fire, 6 families were left homeless, and a mobile home, and 2 houses, were destroyed. (August 9, 1976)
 1976 On August 13, a flash fire in the basement of a house in Bangor, Maine, occurred while a gas company crew was checking for the cause of low gas pressure at the home. The fire killed one gas company employee, burned two other employees, and caused minor damage to the house. One of the crew was using a match to light the basement of the home, and another crew member was smoking when the fire started.
 1976 On August 29, an explosion and fire destroyed a house at Kenosha, Wisconsin. Two persons were killed, four persons were injured, and two adjacent houses were damaged. The destroyed house was not served by natural gas.
 1976 On September 10, sewer work and heavy equipment caused soil subsidence on a 6-inch cast iron gas pipe in Blue Island, Illinois, resulting in the pipe breaking in 4 places. Gas then migrated into a building, that later exploded, killing 1 person, and, injuring 10 others.
 1976 On November 28, an 8-inch Sunoco pipeline began leaking in Toledo, Ohio, spilling about 1,000 barrels of gasoline, forcing a major road closure. There were no injuries.
 1976 An explosion and fire at a gas pipeline compressor station in Orange Grove, Texas killed one plant worker, and injured another on December 6.

References

Lists of pipeline accidents in the United States